Pagyda salvalis is a moth in the family Crambidae. It was described by Francis Walker in 1859. It is found in South Africa, Zimbabwe and Sri Lanka.

References

Moths described in 1859
Pyraustinae